The Field Officer in Brigade Waiting holds an appointment in the Royal Household. He performs his duties at State Ceremonies under the authority of the Lord Great Chamberlain, the Lord Chamberlain and the Earl Marshal. When dismounted he carries a distinctive baton as his insignia of office.

Duties
The Field Officer in Brigade Waiting is to be in attendance on the Sovereign on the following occasions, to receive The King's commands for the Foot Guards:
When the Sovereign drives in State to open or prorogue Parliament.
During a procession from Windsor Castle and in St George's Chapel following a Chapter of the Garter.
When Guards of Honour are mounted by the Guards Division in the presence of The King.

The Field Officer in Brigade Waiting is to command The King's Birthday Parade assisted by the Major of the Parade and the Adjutant of the Parade; all three being mounted on horseback.

Appointment
The Field Officer in Brigade Waiting is appointed by the Major General and is normally his Chief of Staff and deputy. When not available, the Chief of Staff nominates a replacement.

Until the 1980s the post of Field Officer in Brigade Waiting was held in turn by the Lieutenant-Colonels commanding the five regiments of Foot Guards, each serving a month at a time in rotation. Today the post is established on a more permanent footing, except that at the King's Birthday Parade (where the Chief of Staff rides with the Major-General) it is customary for the Commanding Officer of the battalion whose colour is being trooped to command the Parade as Field Officer in Brigade Waiting.

The Field Officer's principal aide when on duty is termed Adjutant in Brigade Waiting.

Insignia of office
A 2-foot baton was commissioned in 1988 following the move to a more permanent pattern of appointment. It consists of a wooden shaft with a silver finial (decorated with the five Foot Guards regimental badges) topped by a crown.

References
The Queen's Regulations for the Army 1975, Amendment No. 26, Annex A to chapter 2, paragraphs 46 - 49

See also
Silver Stick (a similar Household appointment relating to the Household Cavalry)
Trooping the Colour

Positions within the British Royal Household
Ceremonial officers in the United Kingdom
Guards Division (United Kingdom)